Norris is a town in Pickens County, South Carolina, United States. The population was 813 at the 2010 census. It is part of the Greenville–Mauldin–Easley Metropolitan Statistical Area.

Geography
Norris is located at  (34.764904, -82.752192).

Government
The current mayor of Norris is Odell Williams.

Demographics

As of the census of 2000, there were 847 people, 346 households, and 252 families residing in the town. The population density was 447.9 people per square mile (173.0/km2). There were 400 housing units at an average density of 211.5 per square mile (81.7/km2). The racial makeup of the town was 88.08% White, 9.68% African American, 0.47% Native American, 0.71% Asian, 0.59% from other races, and 0.47% from two or more races. Hispanic or Latino of any race were 0.24% of the population.

There were 346 households, out of which 30.1% had children under the age of 18 living with them, 54.6% were married couples living together, 13.3% had a female householder with no husband present, and 26.9% were non-families. 23.4% of all households were made up of individuals, and 8.4% had someone living alone who was 65 years of age or older. The average household size was 2.45 and the average family size was 2.88.

In the town, the population was spread out, with 23.8% under the age of 18, 6.6% from 18 to 24, 31.5% from 25 to 44, 24.3% from 45 to 64, and 13.7% who were 65 years of age or older. The median age was 38 years. For every 100 females, there were 99.3 males. For every 100 females age 18 and over, there were 95.5 males.

The median income for a household in the town was $33,393, and the median income for a family was $37,024. Males had a median income of $27,404 versus $21,563 for females. The per capita income for the town was $13,825. About 7.8% of families and 11.1% of the population were below the poverty line, including 11.2% of those under age 18 and 14.0% of those age 65 or over.

References

External links
 Town of Norris website

Towns in Pickens County, South Carolina
Towns in South Carolina
Upstate South Carolina